Welsh Boys Too is a 2000 short story collection by British author John Sam Jones, published by Parthian Books. In 2002, it was named as a 'Stonewall Honor Book' by the Stonewall Book Awards.

Synopsis
The book is a collection of eight fictional stories inspired by the lives of gay men living in Wales.

Reception
Welsh Boys Too was praised as "intriguing" by Publishers Weekly, and was also positively received in The Western Mail and Gay Times. In 2002, it was named as a 'Stonewall Honor Book in Literature' by the Stonewall Book Awards, which recognised its exceptional merit relating to the gay/lesbian/bisexual/transgender experience.

References

External links

 Entry for Welsh Boys Too on The Babel Guide to Welsh Fiction

2000 short story collections
British short story collections
Gay male teen fiction
LGBT literature in the United Kingdom
2000s LGBT literature
Wales in fiction